Durgesh Nandinii is an Indian television series that aired on Sony TV, which is loosely based on Bankim Chandra Chatterjee's novel Durgeshnandini, the first Bengali romance and the first ever novel in Bengali that was published in 1865.

Plot 
The story of Durgesh Nandinii represent two sides of Indian life – the modern, rich life on one side and the rural countryside life on the other.  The story of this serial takes off when the millionaire industrialist Dharamadas Shrivstava dies and makes an unknowledgeable, parentless girl name Durgesh Nandinii, who lives a small countryside village (Lalgunj) the entire trustee of his property/business.  After hearing the news that the father has given his entire business fortune to some stranger, the two sons and a daughter gets completely shocked.  The whole family is greatly annoyed as Durgesh arrives in their bungalow with her family and cattle and sets up her own little village within their beautiful rich house. From hereon the story takes off.

Cast 
 Rinku Ghosh as Durgesh Nandinii 
 Gurpreet Singh as Sikandar
 Amit Sadh / Ankur Nayyar as Kshitij
 Utkarsha Naik as Durgesh Nandinii's Paternal Aunt
 Nishant Shokeen
 Harshal Gaglani
 Mohit Malik as Sikander
 Amrapali Gupta as Sugandhi
 Deepak Qazir as Dharamdas Khanna
 Nayan Bhatt as Pratibha Dharamdas Khanna 
 Rajesh Kumar as Dheeraj Khanna 
 Tasneem Sheikh as Dheeraj's wife
 Vishal Puri as Kishan Khanna 
 Manini Mishra as Kishan's wife
 Mihir Mishra as Pawan Khanna
 Gurdeep Kohli as Pawan's wife
 Anupam Bhattacharya as Naren Khanna 
 Sonia Kapoor as Kiran Naren Khanna 
 Prakash Ramchandani as Gulati
 Raj Arjun as Chandu

References

External links
 Official Site
 

Indian drama television series
Sony Entertainment Television original programming
Television shows based on Indian novels